QNI may refer to:

 Quality of Nationality Index
 Queensland-New South Wales Interconnector
 Queensland Nickel
 Queen's Nursing Institute
 Quincy Newspapers